Now Esto Es Musica! Latino 2 or Now Latino 2 is a compilation album that was released as a special edition album from the U.S) Now That's What I Call Music! series on November 21, 2006.

Track listing
Juanes – "Lo Que Me Gusta a Mí"
Daddy Yankee – "Machucando"
RKM & Ken-Y – "Down"
RBD – "Este Corazón"
Julieta Venegas – "Me Voy"
Don Omar – "Angelito"
Luis Fonsi – "Paso a Paso"
Mach and Daddy – "La Botella"
Calle 13 – "Se Vale To-To!"
Tito "El Bambino" – "Caile"
Voltio featuring Notch – "Chévere"
Wisin & Yandel featuring Anthony "Romeo" Santos  – "Noche de Sexo"
Thalía featuring Anthony "Romeo" Santos – "No, No, No"
La Oreja de Van Gogh – "Muñeca de Trapo"
Marc Anthony – "Se Esfuma Tu Amor"
Frankie J – "Pensando En Ti"
Reik – "Levemente"
Chelo – "Cha Cha"
Belanova – "Por Ti"
Fonseca – "Te Mando Flores"

2006 compilation albums
Latino 02
Spanish-language compilation albums
Latin music compilation albums